Nuria Llagostera Vives and María José Martínez Sánchez are the defending champions.Sara Errani and Roberta Vinci won in the final 6–1, 3–6, [10–2] against Timea Bacsinszky and Tathiana Garbin.

Seeds

Draw

Draw

References
 Main Draw

Dou